Al-A'sha or Maymun Ibn Qays Al-A'sha (d.c. 570– 625) was an Arabic Jahiliyyah poet from Najd, Arabia.

He traveled through Mesopotamia, Syria, Arabia and Ethiopia. He was nicknamed Al-A'sha which means "weak-sighted" or "night-blind" after he lost his sight. He continued to travel even after becoming blind, particularly along the western coast of the Arabian peninsula. It was then that he turned to the writing of panegyrics as a means of support. His style, reliant on sound effects and full-bodied foreign words, tends to be artificial.

His love poems are devoted to the praise of Huraira, a black female slave. He is said to have believed in the Christian eschatological themes of  Resurrection and Last Judgment, and to have been a monotheist. These beliefs may have been due to his interactions with the bishop of Najrān and the 'Ibādites of Al-Hirah. His poems were praised for their descriptions of the wild ass, for the praise of wine, for their skill in praise and satire, and for the varieties of metre employed.

One of his qasidah or odes is sometimes included in the Mu'allaqat, an early Arabic poetry collection done by the critic Abu 'Ubaydah.

References

570 births
629 deaths
6th-century Arabic poets
7th-century Arabic poets